Larry Lavender is an American dancer and dance scholar. He is the author of the book Dancers Talking Dance: Critical Evaluation in the Choreography Class.

Biography 
Lavender did not begin training in dance until he was a college student. He has a Master of Fine Arts degree in Dance from the University of California, Irvine and a Ph.D in Dance Education from New York University. 

Lavender served as Head of Dance and Director of the Interdisciplinary Undergraduate Program at the University of New Mexico before joining the faculty at the University of North Carolina at Greensboro in the College of Visual and Performing Arts. From 2002 until 2006 Lavender served as Head of the Dance Department at the University of North Carolina at Greensboro. In 2006 he was succeeded by Jan Van Dyke as Department Head and joined the teaching faculty in the department. His research focuses on dance criticism, performance art, dance theory, and choreography. He also teaches Master of Arts courses in the Liberal Studies Program and the Llyod International Honors College at the University of North Carolina at Greensboro. Lavender is a choreographic mentor for the Montreal Danse Choreography Research Project.

In 1996 he wrote the book Dancers Talking Dance: Critical Evaluation in the Choreography Class.

References 

Living people
20th-century American non-fiction writers
American academic administrators
American contemporary dancers
American male dancers
Dance education in the United States
Dance research
Dance teachers
Modern dancers
University of New Mexico faculty
University of North Carolina at Greensboro faculty
University of California, Irvine alumni
New York University alumni
Year of birth missing (living people)